The Sleepwalkers: A History of Man's Changing Vision of the Universe is a 1959 book by Arthur Koestler.  It traces the history of Western cosmology from ancient Mesopotamia to Isaac Newton. He suggests that discoveries in science arise through a process akin to sleepwalking. Not that they arise by chance, but rather that scientists are neither fully aware of what guides their research, nor are they fully aware of the implications of what they discover.

Synopsis

A central theme of the book is the changing relationship between faith and reason. Koestler explores how these seemingly contradictory threads existed harmoniously in many of the greatest intellectuals of the West. He illustrates that while the two are estranged today, in the past the most ground-breaking thinkers were often very spiritual.

Another recurrent theme of this book is the breaking of paradigms in order to create new ones. People, scientists included, cling to cherished old beliefs with such love and attachment that they refuse to see what is wrong in their ideas and the truth in the new ideas that will replace them. (This point was developed a few years afterwards by Thomas Kuhn in The Structure of Scientific Revolutions, in which the concept of "paradigm shift" came to the fore.)
 
Without denying the greatness of Galileo Galilei and the other modern scientists, he pointed out their mistakes and sometimes intellectual dishonesty, arguing that: "The scientific revolution's intellectual giants were dwarfs from a moral point of view". "The conclusion he puts forward at the end of the book is that modern science is trying too hard to be rational. Scientists have been at their best when they allowed themselves to behave as 'sleepwalkers,' instead of trying too earnestly to ratiocinate."

Analysis
The historian of astronomy Owen Gingerich, while acknowledging that Koestler's book contributed to his interest in the history of science, described it (in 2004) as "highly questionable" and criticized its treatment of historical figures as fictional.
Gingerich's work, which he recounts in a book called "The Book Nobody Read: Chasing the Revolutions of Nicolaus Copernicus" in reference to Koestler, shows that the latter was entirely wrong when he said of Copernicus' De Revolutionibus that it was a "book that nobody had read" and "one of the greatest editorial failures of all time".

French mathematician Alexandre Grothendieck cites this work as one of his sources of inspiration in his memorandum entitled

Publication data
 Arthur Koestler, The Sleepwalkers: A History of Man's Changing Vision of the Universe (1959), Hutchinson
 First published in the United States by MacMillan in 1959
 Published by Penguin Books in 1964
 Reissued by Pelican Books in 1968
 Reprinted by Peregrine Books in 1986; 
 Reprinted by Arkana in 1989; 
 Chapters on Kepler excerpted as The Watershed published by Doubleday Anchor in 1960, as part of the Science Study Series.

See also

 1959 in literature
 Owen Gingerich

References

External links
 Frankel, Charles (24 May 1959). "The Road to Great Discovery Is Itself a Thing of Wonder". The New York Times. Retrieved 18 June 2014.

1959 non-fiction books
Astronomy books
Books about the history of science
Books by Arthur Koestler
English non-fiction books
English-language books
Hutchinson (publisher) books
Cosmology books